

List of Rulers of the Akan state of Adanse

See also
Ghana
Gold Coast
Lists of office-holders

Government of Ghana
Rulers
Lists of African rulers